Fredersdorf may refer to:


People

 Herbert B. Fredersdorf (1899–1971), German Filmregisseur

 Michael Gabriel Fredersdorf (1708–1758), Kammerdiener of König Friedrich II. of Prussia

Places
 Fredersdorf, part of Gemeinde Fredersdorf-Vogelsdorf in Landkreis Märkisch-Oderland in Brandenburg
 Fredersdorf station, a railway station located in Fredersdorf-Vogelsdorf

See also
Fredesdorf, a municipality in the district of Segeberg, in Schleswig-Holstein, Germany
Fredersdorfer Mühlenfließ, a river of Brandenburg and Berlin
Friedersdorf (disambiguation)